Miloš Pantović (born 7 July 1996) is a Serbian professional footballer who plays as a forward for Bundesliga club Union Berlin.

Early life
Pantović was born in Munich, after his parents moved there from Arilje, Serbia.

Club career

Early career
Pantović started playing football at the age of six, at first plying his trade with local club Helios Daglfing. He then joined Rot-Weiss Oberföhring and later, in 2007, he joined Bayern Munich U12 team, and then played for every single one of Bayern's youth teams. He started playing for Bayern Munich II in 2014, and was almost instantaneously rewarded with a selection to Serbia U19 national team. He would go on to make six appearances. Pantović made his Bundesliga debut in the 9th fixture of 2015–16 season, replacing Arturo Vidal in 92 minute, and thus became the first Serbian player since Radmilo Mihajlović, 1989-1990, to represent FC Bayern. This would be his only appearance for the first team. He scored seven goals in 28 appearances for the first team 2015–16 season for the reserve team. He scored 15 goals in 27 appearances in the 2016–17 season. He scored 12 goals in 33 appearances in the 2017–18 season.

VfL Bochum
On 14 May 2018, it was announced that he was moving to VfL Bochum in the 2. Bundesliga on a free transfer.

1.FC Union Berlin
On 13 June 2022, Union Berlin announced the signing of Pantovic.

International career
Pantović was called in U19 national team selection in spring 2015, but he played only friendly matches. After he made his debut for the first team of Bayern Munich, Pantović received a call from Tomislav Sivić, coach of U21 selection.

Career statistics

Honours
Bayern Munich
 Bundesliga: 2015-16
DFL-Supercup: 2017

VfL Bochum
 2. Bundesliga: 2020-21

References

External links
 
 
 

1996 births
Living people
German people of Serbian descent
Footballers from Munich
Association football forwards
Serbian footballers
Serbia youth international footballers
Serbia under-21 international footballers
FC Bayern Munich footballers
FC Bayern Munich II players
VfL Bochum players
1. FC Union Berlin players
Bundesliga players
2. Bundesliga players
Regionalliga players
Serbian expatriate footballers
Serbian expatriate sportspeople in Germany
Expatriate footballers in Germany